BrightTALK is a technology media company that provides professional webinar hosting.

History
BrightTALK was founded in London in 2002 by Paul Heald and Dorian Logan to pursue the development of webcasting technologies in knowledge industries. BrightTALK developed its first technology platform to deliver recorded video presentations with synchronized slides and live audio (or webinar) and focused initially on the fund management industry.

BrightTALK later extended its business into other knowledge-based sectors such as information technology and health in addition to B2B media, which they entered through a joint venture with Incisive Media known as Conjecture in 2004.  The first version of BrightTALK Media Zone, a rebuild of the original webcasting technology, launched the following year. The company funded the development of e-Symposium, which it acquired in the end of 2005, and renamed BrightTALK Conferences.

BrightTALK opened its first office in the United States in 2006 and began to develop the technology to make live audio webcasting possible as a self-service tool. The new website launched in September 2008 enables business professionals to find and deliver webinars and videos.

In September 2011, BrightTALK received $20.5 million in funding from North Bridge Growth Equity in exchange for a minority stake in the company.

In December 2020, TechTarget, a B2B intent data service, acquired BrightTALK.

See also
 Webcast
 Web conferencing

References 

Webcasters
Companies based in San Francisco
Companies established in 2002